The 1991 Cork Junior A Hurling Championship was the 94th staging of the Cork Junior A Hurling Championship since its establishment by the Cork County Board. The draw for the opening fixtures took place on 16 December 1990. The championship ran from 8 September to 10 November 1991.

The final replay was played on 10 November 1991 at Páirc Uí Chaoimh in Cork between Aghabullogue and Aghada, in what was their first ever meeting in the final. Aghabullogue won the match by 1-13 to 1-09 to claim their first ever championship title.

Aghabullogue's Joe Healy was the championship's top scorer with 7-20.

Qualification

Results

Quarter-finals

 Kilworth received a bye in this round.

Semi-finals

Final

Championship statistics

Top scorers

Overall

In a single game

References

1991 in hurling
Cork Junior Hurling Championship